Saint Matthew and the Angel (1602) is a painting from the Italian master Caravaggio (1571–1610), completed for the Contarelli Chapel in the church of San Luigi dei Francesi in Rome. It was destroyed in Berlin in 1945 and is now known only from black-and-white photographs and enhanced color reproductions.

Style
Caravaggio was known for painting very realistically, using models instead of standard convention and idealization.  He made his figures lifelike and relatable, as opposed to portraying unrealistic or phony poses. In this instance, however, the patrons wanted an idealization of the beloved Saint, someone who its viewers could admire and strain to be like. They did not want a bumbling peasant who looked as if he just walked in off the street. With the angel sweeping down and the Saint's stool teetering in movement, it is arguably one of Caravaggio's earliest examples of his dynamic style.  It was a much more exciting composition than the first. Even though Caravaggio changed the composition to suit the desires of the patron, you can still see his own style under the more refined subject of Saint Matthew.

History
Saint Matthew and the angel was completed in 1602. A part of the collection of the former Kaiser Friedrich Museum, it was moved to a flak tower for safety, but destroyed by fire at the end of World War II while stored in an anti-aircraft bunker in Berlin. This work, by a pillar of the Baroque movement, might have provided new information about the artist and patron. Reproductions of the original still survive.

Commission
Saint Matthew and the Angel was created  as a commission for the Contarelli Chapel. Caravaggio was previously commissioned to paint two scenes of the saint's life, and after the patrons were satisfied with them, a third was commissioned. 

The Contarelli Chapel was dedicated to Saint Matthew. With funds left for its building left in 1585, it was completed in 1600. Cardinal Del Monte played a major part in orchestrating the decoration of its interior, and was the one who suggested Caravaggio as the painter of the scenes of Saint Matthew's life. The altar was to be composed of two Caravaggio paintings as well as a statue of the saint by Flemish artist Jacob Cobaert.  However, the church was not pleased with the statue and Caravaggio was re-hired to do another piece as the center for the altar, to show Saint Matthew writing the Gospel under the guidance of an angel. Caravaggio depicted the Saint as an unlearned peasant, gaping in the presence of the angel. The church rejected Caravaggio's irreverent presentation of the saint, and Caravaggio replaced it with a more glorifying image, The Inspiration of Saint Matthew, which remains in the Chapel today.

Comparison
The comparison is not perfect because the only images available of the lost Saint Matthew and the Angel are black and white  photographs that were taken before World War II.  The lost painting showed Saint Matthew as poorly groomed, with dirty feet. Although this was the style of Caravaggio, the church leaders thought it was too crude and did not want to have what looked like a peasant hanging in their sacred altarpiece. In addition, they thought that this Matthew did not match the other two paintings that Caravaggio had already done. It was apparently disconnected and therefore had no place with the others. The second piece keeps true to the same subject, but with a few changes. Matthew looks more like the other two Matthews in the altar. The Saint is now more serious and in control in the presence of the angel. Instead of being fully controlled by the angel, Saint Matthew is only encouraged by the angel in the second one. He is working more on his own accord. Nevertheless, the surviving version loses the touching directness of the first - the childlike angel patiently guiding the Saint's hand on the page as though he were the child.

See also
Artistic scandal
List of paintings by Caravaggio

Notes

References
Hess, Jacob. "Chronology of the Contarelli Chapel." The Burlington Magazine 93, no. 579 (June 1951): 186–201.
Spear, RE. "Caravaggio." The Burlington Magazine 147, no. 1223 (2005): 140–142.
Thomas, Troy. "Expressive Aspects of Caravaggio's First Inspiration of Saint Matthew." The Art Bulletin 67, no. 4 (December 1985): 636–652.
Vodret Adamo, Rossella and Sinebrychoffin Taidemuseo. Caravaggio: The Mystery of the Two Saint Francis in Meditation. Milano:Silvana, 2009.

External links

1602 paintings
Paintings by Caravaggio
Religious paintings
Religious controversies in painting
Angels in art
Books in art
Paintings depicting Matthew the Apostle